The Aulnois (also: Aunois) is a Franco-Belgian river which flows in the French Ardennes département and in the province of Luxembourg in the far south of Belgian Wallonia. It is a fairly fast-flowing right tributary of the Chiers.

Geography
The Aulnois rises in the forest of Muno which stretches over the south of the Belgian province of Luxembourg. It generally flows southwards throughout its course. After crossing the Franco-Belgian border it continues towards the south until its confluence with the Chiers, which occurs at Carignan in the Ardennes just after the Aulnois has received its main tributary, the Matton.

Localities along the Aulnois
The Aulnois flows through the French communes of Messincourt, Pure, Osnes and Carignan, all in the Ardennes département. In Belgium it flows through Muno, part of the Florenville municipality in the province of Luxembourg.

Tributaries
 La Goutelle, a right tributary, received at Messincourt.
 Matton, a left tributary received at Carignan.

Hydrology
The Aulnois is a small but substantial river. Its specific flow rate thus reaches the high value of 20.6 litres per second per square kilometre of watershed.

Heritage 
 Messincourt, with the remains of a castle razed at the beginning of the 16th century having many underground works, a former church with a bell tower from the 18th century and a building in the centre from the 12th and 13th centuries called the "Château", as well as woods and forests.
 Pure, with an old church reconstructed in 1830, forges, and woodland.
 Osnes, a village which once hosted a significant metallurgy industry. It has a 16th-century church restored in the 18th century. The church has a 12th-century altar and an educational display.
 Carignan, the former Gallo-Roman Epoisso Vicus, constructed on the road from Reims to Trèves. Known as "Yvois" up until its annexation to France in the 1659 Treaty of the Pyrenees (1659), it was razed to the ground by Gaspard III de Coligny. It has a Gallo-Roman villa and a Merovingian Necropolis, as well as the remains of the fortified compound from the 16th century, reconstituted in the 17th century with curtain walls, bastions and casemates, and the 17th century Porte de Bourgogne guardhouse. Carignan also has a collegiate church from the 16th and 17th centuries featuring a 16th-century virgin with child and pictures from the 17th and 18th centuries, as well as hosting the "Conservatoire de l'Outil" tool museum, a gymnastic association and a sports club.

See also
 List of rivers of France
 List of rivers of Belgium
 Meuse
 Chiers
 Carignan, Ardennes

References

External links
 
 
 

Rivers of the Ardennes (Belgium)
Rivers of the Ardennes (France)
Rivers of Belgium
Rivers of France
Rivers of Ardennes (department)
Rivers of Grand Est
Rivers of Luxembourg (Belgium)
Florenville
International rivers of Europe